David James Tyson Kitchin, Lord Kitchin, PC (born 30 April 1955) is a Justice of the Supreme Court of the United Kingdom. He has also served as a Lord Justice of Appeal.

Career
Having attended Oundle School and studied Natural Sciences as an undergraduate at Fitzwilliam College, Cambridge, Kitchin switched to Law in his final year and was called to the Bar (Gray's Inn) in 1977; he has been a bencher since 2003. During his university days, he also coxed the Cambridge team that won the 1975 Boat Race.

He became a Queen's Counsel in 1994. In 2001, he was appointed a Deputy High Court Judge. He was appointed to the High Court of Justice on 3 October 2005 and assigned to the Chancery Division; he was knighted in the same year. Kitchin has served as Chancery Supervising Judge for the Wales, Western and Midland Circuits since 2009. In 2011, he was appointed a Lord Justice of Appeal effective 5 October 2011, and received the customary appointment to the Privy Council.

He became a Justice of the Supreme Court of the United Kingdom on 1 October 2018, taking the judicial courtesy title of Lord Kitchin.

References

1955 births
People educated at Oundle School
Alumni of Fitzwilliam College, Cambridge
Chancery Division judges
Knights Bachelor
Living people
Members of Gray's Inn
Members of the Privy Council of the United Kingdom
Judges of the Supreme Court of the United Kingdom
Lords Justices of Appeal
Members of the Judicial Committee of the Privy Council
20th-century King's Counsel
21st-century King's Counsel